Benzyltrimethylammonium fluoride is a quaternary ammonium salt. It is commercially available as the hydrate. The compound is a source of organic-soluble fluoride to removal of silyl ether protecting groups.  As is the case for tetra-n-butylammonium fluoride and most other quaternary ammonium fluorides, the compound cannot be obtained in anhydrous form.

References 

Quaternary ammonium compounds
Fluorides
Reagents for organic chemistry
Benzyl compounds